The Han River or Hangang is a major river in South Korea and the fourth longest river on the Korean peninsula after the Amnok (Yalu), Tuman (Tumen), and Nakdong rivers. The river begins as two smaller rivers in the eastern mountains of the Korean peninsula, which then converge near Seoul, the capital of the country.

The Hangang River and its surrounding area have played an important role in Korean history. The Three Kingdoms of Korea strove to take control of this land, where the river was used as a trade route to China (via the Yellow Sea). The river is no longer actively used for navigation, because its estuary is located at the borders of the two Koreas, barred for entrance by any civilian.

The river serves as a water source for over 12 million South Koreans. In July 2000, the United States military admitted to having dumped formaldehyde in the sewer system connected to the river, causing protests.

The lower stretches of the Hangang River are lined with pedestrian walkways, bicycle paths, public parks and restaurants, particularly in Seoul. In a 2011 survey conducted by Seoul Development Institute of 800 residents and 103 urban planning and architectural experts, 51.3 percent of residents and 68.9 percent of experts voted the river the second most scenic location in the city, following Mount Namsan in the top spot.

Geography
The Hangang is formed by the confluence of the Namhan River (South Hangang River), which originates in Mount Daedeoksan, and the Bukhan River (North Hangang River), which originates on the slopes of Kumgangsan Mountain in North Korea. The River flows through Seoul and then merges with the Imjingang River (or Rimjingang River) shortly before it flows into the Yellow Sea. The two major branches of the river, the Namhangang River and the Bukhangang River, come together at Yangpyeong, Gyeonggi province, at which point it is referred to as the Hangang River. It then passes through Seoul and continues on to the Yellow Sea. Broad tidal flats can be found at the mouth of the Hangang River, where it meets the sea along the Korean Demilitarized Zone that divides South and North Korea.

Although it is not a long river, the lower Hangang is remarkably broad for such a relatively short river. Prior to the construction of a number of major dams, the river was known for its huge coefficient of river regime (ratio between the maximum and minimum amount of flow) of 1:390. (For comparison, The Thames and the Rhine have coefficients of 1:8 and 1:18, respectively.)

Name
The Namhangang (Namhan meaning "Southern Han" and gang meaning "river") is sometimes, but not always, referred to as the "Han" in South Korea. The term "Southern Han" is understood irrespective of which side of the border one stands.

Even though "Namhan" and "Bukhan" are homophones with the acronyms Namhan ("South Korea") and Bukhan ("North Korea"), used commonly in South Korea, this is a mere coincidence. The hanja for the Hangang River is not  ("Korea") but  (Chinese). As a result, Koreans rarely use 漢 because 韓 and 漢 sound the same (han), but the meaning is 韓 (han, 한, "Korean"), not "Han Chinese".

Hangang River has been called by different names through the course of Korean history. During the early part of the Three Kingdoms period the river was often referred to as the Daesu ("the Regional Waters"). The state of Goguryeo called it the Arisu ("The Gainful Waters"). Baekje called it the Ungniha ("Fragrant Mile River"), while the kingdom of Silla termed it the Iha ("Muddy River").

History
The Hangang River has played a central role in Korean history from the earliest times. The kingdom of Baekje was the first to lay claim to the Hangang River, recognizing its strategic significance as a primary waterway linking the central western region of the peninsula with the Yellow Sea. It was also recognized for the river's fertile alluvial banks, a relative rarity on the mountainous peninsula. Pungnaptoseong, located south of Seoul, is posited as an early capital of Baekje. It was not long before the region near the mouth of the Hangang River on the Yellow Sea, around present-day Seoul, became a bone of contention between Baekje and the rising kingdom of Goguryeo. During the reign of its King Jangsu (r. 413-491) Goguryeo wrested the western terminus of the Hangang River from its rival Baekje. The ensuing decades would see a tug-of-war over the region until 551 when Baekje, in an alliance with Silla, confirmed its control over the Hangang River basin. But this alliance was not to last, and in 553 Silla broke its alliance with Baekje to seize control of the entire river as part of its bid for domination of the peninsula.

With the demise of both Baekje and Goguryeo and then the unification of the peninsula under Silla in 668, the Hangang River entered its long era as a "Korean river", first under the control of Unified Silla (668-918), then of the succeeding Goryeo dynasty (918-1392), and finally as part of the Joseon dynasty (1392-1910). During the Joseon period the Han River achieved new prominence as the primary waterway of the new Korean capital of Seoul, then called Hanyang. 

Within the first week of the start of the Korean War the South Korean Army destroyed the Hangang Bridge in a bid to stem the advance of the invading North Korean military. In early 1951, there was a fair amount of fighting between Chinese People's Volunteer Army troops and US-led United Nations forces in the Hangang River area surrounding Seoul (refer to Operation Thunderbolt during the Korean War).

The Hangang River now belongs largely to the Republic of Korea, or South Korea, with its mouth on the Yellow Sea a few nautical miles from North Korea (though some of the river's tributaries are in North Korea). During the first few decades of South Korea's existence the Hangang River became a byword for pollution, as burgeoning industry and an impoverished populace used it as a convenient spillway for industrial and urban refuse. Though it no longer plays a central role in commerce or transportation it is a prime fixture in the life of the South Korean capital and in the last decade has become the focus of government sponsored environmental efforts to clean it up and transform it into an ecological jewel of the capital. During the 1988 Summer Olympics in Seoul, the Hangang River was the site of the Olympic rowing regatta.

There have been fears, such as the 1986 Water Panic in South Korea, that North Korea could attack Seoul by releasing waters from upstream dams, creating floods downstream.

In July 2000, the US military admitted to dumping 20 gallons (75.7 liters) of diluted formaldehyde in the sewer system connected to the river. As the river serves as a drinking source for some 12 million South Koreans, some South Koreans launched large protests and accused the US military of ignoring South Korea's environmental regulations. Activists lobbed toy rockets—filled with water from the river—into the main US Army base. The political party Green Party Korea had earlier accused the US of dumping nearly 60 gallons of the toxic chemical into the river, and said that "... if people are exposed to the chemical for a long period of time, it could cause lung cancer [and when] dissolved into water, it could kill fish and other aquatic creatures." The events inspired Bong Joon-ho's acclaimed 2006 film The Host.

From 2009 the Lee Myung Bak administration resuscitated a project to dig a canal linking the Hangang River with the Yellow Sea at Incheon. This eighteen kilometer Ara Canal was completed in 2012 and now links the Han River near Gimpo in Seoul to Incheon. It can accommodate both large container and passenger vessels.

Joint Utilization Zone
On November 4, 2018, a 20-member team consisting of 10 people from North Korea and 10 people from South Korea began a joint inter-Korean survey which will lead to the development a Joint Utilization Zone along the Hangang River's estuary. The Zone will allow civilians to access the estuary for tourism, ecological protection and the collection of construction aggregate under the protection of militaries from both sides of the Korean border.  On November 5, 2018, the councils of South Korea's Gangwon and Gyeonggi provinces, which border the DMZ, signed a “peace working agreement” at Dorasan Station in Paju, giving local approval to the Joint Utilization Zone. The inter-Korean survey of the Han River's estuary was completed on December 9, 2018. The new map of the river's estuary, which consists of newly discovered reefs, will made public by January 25, 2019.

Tributaries of the Hangang River
Tributaries are listed in order from the mouth of the Hangang to the source.  Subtributaries are listed accordingly.

Gongneungcheon (곡능천)
Najinhacheon (나진하천)
Changneungcheon (창능천)
Anyangcheon (안양천)
Dorimcheon (도림천)
Jungnangcheon (중랑천)
Cheonggyecheon (청계천)
Tancheon (탄천)
Yangjaecheon (양재천)
Yeosucheon (여수천)
Bundangcheon (분당천)
Pungdeokcheon (풍덕천)
Gyeongancheon (경안천)
Neungwoncheon (능원천)
Yangjicheon (양지천)
Unhakcheon (운학천)
Bukhan River (북한강)
Munhocheon (문호천)
Hongcheongang River (홍천강)
Sandaecheon (산대천)
Deoksancheon (덕산천)
Seongjeoncheon (성전천)
Yasidaecheon (야시대천)
Gapyeongcheon (가평천)
Soyanggang River (소양강)
Sanaecheon (사내천)
Yongdamcheon (용담천)
Magunaemeo (마구내머)
Mahyeoncheon (마현천)
Bongocheon (봉오천)
Namhangang River (남한강)
Sinnaegaeul (신내개울)
Heukcheon (흑천)
Yongdamcheon (용담천)
Bokhacheon (복하천)
Jukdangcheon (죽당천)
Pyogocheon (표고천)
Gwanricheon (관리천)
Yanghwacheon (양화천)
Geumdangcheon (금당천)
Cheongmicheon (청미천)
Gyecheon (계천)
Ungcheon (웅천)
Seomgang River (섬강)
Iricheon (이리천)
Mokmicheon (목미천)
Hwangsancheon (환산천)
Guryoncheon (구룡천)
Yeongdeokcheon (영덕천)
Daejeoncheon (대전천)
Dalcheon (달천)
Yodocheon (요도천)
Donggang (동강)

Bridges over the lower Hangang
A total of 31 bridges cross the Hangang River in Seoul National Capital Area (Seoul, Gyeonggi, Incheon), South Korea. They are:

From the west to the east

	Ilsan Bridge; 일산대교 
	Gimpo Bridge; 김포대교 
	Haengju Bridge; 행주대교 
	Banghwa Bridge; 방화대교 
   Magok Bridge; 마곡대교
	Gayang Bridge; 가양대교
   World Cup Bridge; 월드컵대교 
	Seongsan Bridge; 성산대교 
	Yanghwa Bridge; 양화대교 
	Dangsan Railway Bridge; 당산철교 
	Seogang Bridge; 서강대교 
	Mapo Bridge; 마포대교 
	Wonhyo Bridge; 원효대교 
	Hangang Railway Bridge; 한강철교 
	Hangang Bridge; 한강대교 
	Dongjak Bridge; 동작대교 
	Banpo Bridge with Jamsu Bridge; 반포대교와 잠수교 
	Hannam Bridge; 한남대교 
	Dongho Bridge; 동호대교 
	Seongsu Bridge; 성수대교 
	Yeongdong Bridge; 영동대교 
	Cheongdam Bridge; 청담대교 
	Jamsil Bridge; 잠실대교 
	Jamsil Railway Bridge; 잠실철교 
	Olympic Bridge; 올림픽대교 
	Cheonho Bridge; 천호대교 
	Gwangjin Bridge; 광진교 
   Guri-Amsa Bridge; 구리암사대교
	Gangdong Bridge; 강동대교 
   Route 60
	Paldang Bridge; 팔당대교

Subways crossing Hangang River
Seoul Subway Line 1 (Yongsan~Noryangjin)
Seoul Subway Line 2 (Gangbyeon~Jamsillaru, Dangsan~Hapjeong)
Seoul Subway Line 3 (Oksu~Apgujeong)
Seoul Subway Line 4 (Ichon~Dongjak)
Seoul Subway Line 5 (Yeouinaru~Mapo, Gwangnaru~Cheonho)
Seoul Subway Line 7 (Ttukseom Resort~Cheongdam)
Airport Railroad (Gimpo International Airport~Digital Media City)
Bundang Line (Apgujeongrodeo~Seoul Forest)

In 2017, Line 8 will open to extension that will cross the Hangang River.
In 2022, the Shinbundang Line will cross Hangang River by a tunnel beneath the riverbed.

In media
The Hangang River features as a location in several movies. Notable films include:
 The Host (2006) in which the Wonhyo Bridge plays an important part. It is about a monster living along the Hangang River casting fear amongst the citizens of Seoul by attacking and eating them alive.
  Castaway on the Moon (2009) in which Bamseom island is the island the main character finds himself stranded on.
 Inchon (1981), which includes the destruction of the Hangang Bridge.

See also
 Rivers of Asia
 List of rivers of Korea
 Geography of South Korea
 Miracle on the Han River
 Hangang Park

Notes

References

Citations

Bibliography
 .

External links

Hangang Citizen's Park operated by Seoul Metropolitan Government
Korea Times article on the river's modern history
Brief History of Hangang (River)

 
Rivers of Gangwon Province, South Korea
Rivers of Gyeonggi Province
Rivers of Seoul
Rivers of Korea
North Hwanghae
International rivers of Asia
Tourist attractions in Seoul